The surname Ray has several origins.

Ray is a historical title of royalty and nobility in the Indian subcontinent used by rulers and chieftains of many princely states. It is derived from Raja. The Marathi/Telugu variant Rai was used as a substitute to King. Rai has no trace in sanskrit origin.

Origin of the surname

In some cases it originate from a nickname, derived from the Old French rei, roy, meaning "king", which was sometimes also used as a personal name. This nickname may have denoted a person's pride or swagger, someone's appearance, or regal behavior or bearing, or may have referred to achievement in a contest, royal service, or may have denoted someone who presided over certain festive celebrations. Early examples of forms of this surname include: William Lerei, in 1195 (Norfolk); Robert Raie, in 1206 (Cambridgeshire); and Thomas filius Rey, in 1296 (Cambridgeshire).

In other cases, the surname originates from a nickname derived from the northern Middle English rā, rae, ray (Old English rā, Old Norse rā), meaning "roe deer", or the Middle English ray (Old English rœge), meaning "female roe deer". This nickname may have denoted a timid person or a swift runner.

In other cases, the surname is derived from the Scottish Gaelic Mac Raith, a surname derived from the Gaelic personal name Macraith, "son of grace". Early examples of forms of this surname include: Alexander Macrad, in about 1225 (Dumbartonshire); Patric McRe, in 1376 (Dumfriesshire); and Adam McCreich, in 1438.

In other cases, the surname is a variant of Rye. In such cases, the surname may originate from two locative names: one is derived from a form of the Middle English atter ye, "meaning at the island" (Old English œt thœre ige), for someone who lived on an island or a patch of firm ground; the other is derived from a form of the Middle English atter eye, meaning "at the river" (Old English œt thœre eœ) for someone who lived near a river or stream. Early examples of forms of the surname Rye include: William de Rye, in 1240 (Essex); Ralph de Rye, in 1248 (Essex); and Ralph de la Reye, in 1279 (Oxfordshire).

In other cases, the surname may be a variant of the surname Wray, a variant of Wroe, derived from the Middle English wroe (Old Scandinavian vrá), meaning "nook, corner of land". Early examples of forms of the surname Wray include: Willelmus del Wra, in 1379 (Lancashire); Ricardus del Wra, in 1377 (West Yorkshire); and Willelmus in the Wraa, in 1379 (West Yorkshire).

In other cases, the surname is of Ashkenazic Jewish origin. In other cases, the surname may have originated as locative name, derived from the Old French raier, meaning "to gush, stream, or pour". In other cases, the surname is a variant of Indian surname Rai. In some case, the surname Rai is derived from the Sanskrit raja, meaning "king". In other cases, specifically in Karnataka, the origin of the surname is unknown.

People with this surname 

Adam E. Ray (1808–1865), American politician
Adam Ray (comedian), American comedian and actor
Adil Ray (born 1974), British radio and television presenter
Aindrita Ray (born 1984), Indian film actress 
A. N. Ray Ajit Nath Ray (1912–2010), Indian Bengali jurist
Aldo Ray (1926–1991), American actor
Allan Ray (born 1984), American professional basketball player
Amy Ray (born 1964), American singer-songwriter, member of the Indigo Girls
Andrew Ray (1939–2003), British actor
Anna Chapin Ray (1865–1945), American author
Annada Shankar Ray (1904–2002), Indian Bengali poet and essayist
Benjamin Ray (born 1819), American politician
Bharatchandra Ray (1712–1760), Indian Bengali poet and composer
Bill Ray (disambiguation), several people
 Bill Ray (bishop) (born 1950), Anglican bishop of North Queensland in Australia
 Bill Ray (politician) (1922–2013), American businessman, politician, and writer
 Bill Ray (photojournalist) (1936–2020), photojournalist
Billy Ray (screenwriter), screenwriter, director, and producer
Blaine Ray, American creator of TPR Storytelling
Bob Ray, American filmmaker
Bobby Ray (actor) (1899–1957), American comedian and film director
Bobby Ray (singer), American recording artist from Texas
Bobby Ray Parks Jr., Filipino professional basketball player
Bonnie Ray, American statistician and data scientist
Brian Ray (born 1955), American musician
Charles A. Ray (1829-1912), American judge
Charles W. Ray (1872–1959), American recipient of Medal of Honor
Charlotte B. Ray (c. 1813 – 25 October 1891), American prominent suffragist and abolitionist
Chris Ray (born 1982), American baseball pitcher
Clifford Ray (born 1949), American basketball coach and former player
Daniel Burrill Ray (1928–1979), American mathematician
Danny Ray (singer) (born 1951), Jamaican-born reggae singer and record producer
Danny Ray (saxophonist) (born 1951), American saxophonist
David Parker Ray (1939–2002), American suspected serial killer (known as the "Toy-Box Killer")
David Ray (1932-), American    poet
David R. Ray (1945–1969), United States Navy sailor
Dave "Snaker" Ray (1943–2002), American blues singer and guitarist
Dixy Lee Ray (1914–1994), American scientist and politician, former Governor of Washington
Dorothy Jean Ray (born 1919), American anthropologist 
Dwijendralal Ray (1863–1913), Indian Bengali poet, playwright, and musician
Edgar Ray (1828–1905), founder of "Punch" magazines in Australia
Elise Ray (born 1982), American gymnast
Elmer Ray (born 1912), American heavyweight boxer
Frank Edward "Ed" Ray (1921–2012), American bus driver hero in 1976 Chowchilla kidnapping
Fred Olen Ray (born 1954), American director, producer, screenwriter, actor, and cinematographer
Gabrielle Ray (1883–1973), British stage actress, dancer and singer
Ganendra Narayan Ray (born 1933), Indian Bengali jurist
Gene Ray, American, creator of website Time Cube
Gene Anthony Ray (1962–2003), American actor, dancer, and choreographer
George Augustus Ray (1819–1893), American politician
Gordon Norton Ray (1915–1986), American biographer and professor of English
Gourishankar Ray (1838–1917), Indian Odia language activist
Greg Ray (born 1966), American IRL IndyCar Series driver
Herbert J. Ray (1893–1970), American admiral
Isaac Ray (1807–1881), American psychiatrist
James Ray (disambiguation) several people, including:
James B. Ray (1794–1848), American politician
James Earl Ray (1928–1998), American convicted of assassinating Martin Luther King
James Enos Ray Jr. (1874–1934), American politician
James Ray (rock musician), rock musician, member of The Sisterhood and James Ray's Gangwar
James Ray (singer) (1941–1964), African-American R&B singer
Jamini Bhushan Ray (1879–1926), Indian Bengali physician, Sanskritist, and philanthropist
Janisse Ray (born 1962), American writer, naturalist, and environmental activist
Jean Ray (1941–2007), American folk singer of Jim and Jean duo
Jean Ray (author), Belgian writer
Jeremy Ray, Australian television presenter and video game reviewer
Jimmy Ray (born 1970), British pop-rock musician
Joe Ray, of Nero (musicians), British dubstep trio
John Ray (1627–1705), British naturalist
John H. Ray (1886–1975), American politician
Johnnie Ray (1927–1990), American singer, songwriter, and pianist
Johnny Ray (racing driver) (born 1937), American NASCAR driver
Johnny Ray (second baseman) (born 1957), American baseball player
Joie Ray (athlete) (Joseph W. Ray; 1894–1978), American middle-distance runner
Joie Ray (racing driver) (Joseph Reynolds Ray, Jr.; 1923–2007), American race car driver
Jonah Ray (born 1982), American actor, comedian and writer
Joseph Ray (disambiguation), includes                                  
Joseph Warren Ray (1849–1928), American politician
Karen B. Ray, American politician
Ken Ray (born 1974), American baseball pitcher
LaBryan Ray (born 1997), American football player
Lionel Ray (born 1935), French poet and essayist
Lisa Ray (born 1972), Canadian actress and former model
Little Ray, American musician
Man Ray (1890–1976), American artist
Manju Ray, Indian biochemist and cancer researcher
Mary Ruth Ray (1956–2013), American classical violist
Mike Ray (born 1936), Canadian politician
Marcus Ray, main character in Knock Off (film)
Nicholas Ray (1911–1979), American filmmaker
Niharranjan Ray (1903–1981), Indian Bengali historian
Norman W. Ray (born 1942), American admiral
Ola Ray (born 1960), American model and actress
Prafulla Chandra Ray (1861–1944), Indian Bengali chemist, educator and entrepreneur
Pratibha Ray (born 1943), Indian Odia writer
Rabi Ray (born 1926), Indian Odia politician, former speaker of Lok Sabha
Rachael Ray (born 1968), American television personality, celebrity chef and author
Radhanath Ray (1848–1908), Indian Odia poet
Raja Sitaram Ray (1658–1714), Indian rebel king who fought against the Mughal Empire
Ray brothers, American, three hemophiliac brothers diagnosed with HIV in 1986
Reginald Ray, American Buddhist academic and Vajra Master
Renuka Ray (1904–1997), Indian Bengali social activist  
Rex Ray, American fine artist and graphic designer
Richie Ray (born 1945), American musician and minister of duo Richie Ray & Bobby Cruz
Ricky Ray (born 1979), Canadian and American football quarterback
Rob Ray (born 1968), Canadian sports broadcaster and former ice hockey player
Robbie Ray (born 1991), American baseball pitcher
Robbie Ray (racing driver), American racing driver
Robert Ray (disambiguation), several people
 Robert D. Ray (1928–2018), Governor of Iowa 1969 to 1983
 Robert D. Ray (1978–2000), one of the Ray brothers (above)
 Robert R. Ray, Reconstruction era sheriff and state legislator in Feliciana, Louisiana
 Robert Ray (artist) (1924–2002), American artist
 Robert Ray (Australian politician) (born 1947), Labor Party Senator for Victoria
 Robert Ray (prosecutor) (born 1960), final Whitewater Special Counsel
 Robert Ray (baseball) (born 1984), baseball pitcher
Robin Ray (1934–1998), British actor, musician and broadcaster
Ronnie Ray (born 1954), American track and field athlete
Ruth Ray (1919–1977), American artist
Sandip Ray (born 1953), Indian Bengali filmmaker
Satyajit Ray (1921–1992), Indian Bengali filmmaker
Scottie Ray (born 1964), American voice actor
Shawn Ray (born 1965) American author and former professional bodybuilder
Sibnarayan Ray (1921–2008), Indian Bengali educationist, philosopher and literary critic
Siddhartha Shankar Ray (1920–2010), chief minister of West Bengal and governor of Punjab
Siddharth Ray (1963–2004), Indian Marathi actor
Sidney Herbert Ray (1858–1939), American linguist
Stevie Ray (born 1958), American wrestler
Sukumar Ray (1887–1923), Indian Bengali nonsense poet, story writer and playwright
Tanika Ray, American television personality
Ted Ray (comedian) (1905–1977), British comedian
Ted Ray (golfer) (1877–1943), British professional golfer
Thomas S. Ray, American ecologist who created the Tierra project
Upendrakishore Ray (1863–1915), Indian Bengali writer, painter, violinist and composer
William Ray (disambiguation) several people, including
 Sir William Ray (British politician), Leader of London County Council, MP for Richmond
 William Ray (medicine) (1884–1953), academic in Adelaide, South Australia
 William H. Ray (1812–1881), United States Representative from Illinois
 William Hallett Ray (1825–1909), Canadian politician, farmer, and merchant
 William M. Ray (born 1963), American judge
 Wyatt Ray (born 1996), American football player

Fictional characters
Amuro Ray
Charles Lee Ray

See also
 Del Ray (disambiguation)
 Le Ray (disambiguation)
 Leray
 Rae (surname)
 Rai (surname)
 Ray (given name)
 Rey (surname)
 Rhea (name)
 Roy
 Wray (surname)

Citations

References

English-language surnames
Indian surnames
Bengali Hindu surnames